Cowley is a village and civil parish in the Cotswold District of Gloucestershire, England.  It lies between the A417 and A435 roads between Cheltenham and Cirencester in the Churn Valley, and has a population of 333.  The name originates from 'cow' and 'leigh', literally meaning cow pasture.

Its main features are Cowley Manor which was owned by the Horlicks family and is currently being used as a country hotel. The Grade II* listed parish church of St. Mary lies next to the Manor and dates from the 12th century. The village pub is the Green Dragon, which is not far from the Gloucestershire Girl Guides HQ, Deerpark.
Cowley also has a Sunday cricket team, which plays at the ground towards the west side of the village near the Green Dragon pub.
The village used to own its own village hall (which used to be the old school house); however, the parish council have sold this in recent years and it has been converted into a private residence.
Considering that it has a pub, hotel, church, and Girl Guide HQ, Cowley still can boast a post box and telephone box as the only forms of  public amenities. The local town and shops are in Cheltenham, and many people who live in the village work in Cheltenham, even though Cirencester is only 30 minutes' drive away.
The village consists of approximately 40 houses and they are scattered around a circular road that curls up the edge of a small valley and then runs back down the bottom of the V shape. The 'back lane' has only two houses on it compared to the higher lane that holds most of the residents. Further up the small valley is a collection of three houses on a hilltop. The entrance to Cowley from the A435 is through two large pillars, either side of the road entrance, existing from the entrance of the Cowley Manor estate.

The village falls in Ermin electoral ward. This ward starts in Cowley in the north, follows the A417 road, and ends at Daglingworth in the south. The total ward population taken in the 2011 census was 1,793.

Attractions around the area include Cirencester, Shabb Hill scenic view, Crickley Hill Country Park, and Cheltenham.

The village is popular with ramblers and general Cotswold visitors. Many of the residents are not local to the area anymore, but have settled in the village because of its quick connections to London.

References

External links

Villages in Gloucestershire
Cotswold District